Tim Wolf (born January 25, 1992) is a Swiss professional ice hockey goaltender who is currently playing with HC Ajoie of the National League (NL). Wolf made his European Elite debut during the 2010–11 season playing in the National League with the ZSC Lions.

Playing career
In the 2014–15 season, Wolf played in a career high 38 games in the NL with the Rapperswil-Jona Lakers, however was unable to save the club from relegation. On August 3, 2015, he was signed to remain in the top league, by HC Ambrì-Piotta to a one-year deal as a replacement for Nolan Schaefer.

International play
Wolf participated at the 2012 World Junior Ice Hockey Championships as a member of the Switzerland men's national junior ice hockey team.

References

External links

1992 births
Living people
HC Ambrì-Piotta players
HC La Chaux-de-Fonds players
GCK Lions players
SC Rapperswil-Jona Lakers players
Swiss ice hockey goaltenders
ZSC Lions players
Ice hockey people from Zürich